New Blood is the third studio album from Dutch electronic music duo Yellow Claw. The album was released on 22 June 2018 through Barong Family. It features collaborations with producers, San Holo, DJ Snake, Chace and Moksi. New Blood was produced as a musical travelogue by the duo, reflecting their experiences around the world during their global tours. Seven singles were released with the record: "Summertime", "Crash This Party", "Bittersweet", "Fake Chanel", "To The Max", "Public Enemy", and "Waiting".

Critical reception 
Dancing Astronaut quoted that the album felt "more diverse in scope than what one would usually experience at a Yellow Claw set" and consisted of tracks which "fall in line with their signature sound without stretching too far outside their comfort zone". They affirmed that rather than being a "terrible listen", the record was "more than entertaining, with its future bass valleys and rap-assisted, trap peaks." Matthew Meadow of Your EDM praised the "healthy combination of hype versus mellow tracks" and the "generous helping" of vocalists which provides "a wide range of depth and variety that resembles Blood for Mercy more closely than their second album."

Track listing 
Tracklist adapted from the iTunes Store.

Charts

References

2018 albums
Yellow Claw (DJs) albums